Tomasz Schuchardt (born 18 September 1986) is a Polish actor. He has appeared in more than twenty films since 2007.

Selected filmography

References

External links 

1986 births
Living people
Polish male film actors
Polish film actors
Polish male stage actors